Verkhny Zhirim is a rural locality (a selo) in Tarbagataysky District, Republic of Buryatia, Russia. The population was 964 as of 2010. There are 8 streets.

Geography 
Verkhny Zhirim is located 27 km southwest of Tarbagatay (the district's administrative centre) by road. Barykino is the nearest rural locality.

References 

Rural localities in Tarbagataysky District